Founded in 2004, Hybris is an independent record label located in Sweden. The Stockholm department is run by Mattias Lövkvist and John Gadnert and the Malmö department by Kalle Magnusson. A sister company to Hybris is Aloaded, working with complete distribution, label services and release promotion.

Roster
Postiljonen
Jonathan Johansson
Wy
1987 
Far & Son
Juvelen
Andreas Mattson
El Perro del Mar
Familjen
Monty
KOMMUN
Hell on Wheels (band)
Kalle J
The Kid
The Sweptaways
Like Honey
Lucas Nord
Montt Mardié
Sibiria
Vapnet
TIAC (Three Is A Crowd)
Biker Boy
Azure Blue
Echo Ladies

See also
 List of record labels

References

External links
Official site

Swedish independent record labels